Feyzabad (also Romanized as Feyẕābād, Feyzābād, and Faizābād) is a village in Sirch Rural District, Shahdad District, Kerman County, Kerman Province, Iran. At the 2006 census, its population was 453, in 113 families.

References 

Populated places in Kerman County